Gayle Coats Fulks (born April 6, 1985) is an American women's basketball coach with the Davidson Wildcats.

Career
She played collegiately with the Fairleigh Dickinson Knights. In May 2017, Coats Fulks left Wake Forest to be named the 12th women's basketball head coach in Davidson history.

In her first season with the Wildcats, the team finished 12–18 overall and 7–9 in conference.

Fairleigh Dickinson statistics 

Source

Head Coaching Record
Source

References

External links
 Davidson biography

1985 births
Living people
American women's basketball coaches
American women's basketball players
Basketball coaches from Virginia
Basketball players from Virginia
Davidson Wildcats women's basketball coaches
Fairleigh Dickinson Knights women's basketball players
Longwood Lancers women's basketball coaches
Sportspeople from Virginia Beach, Virginia
UNC Greensboro Spartans women's basketball coaches
Wake Forest Demon Deacons women's basketball coaches